Cochet is a French surname. Notable people with the surname include:

Gérard Cochet (1888–1969), French illustrator
Gustavo Cochet (1894–1979), Argentine painter, engraver and writer
Henri Cochet (1901–1987), French tennis player
Jonathan Cochet (born 1977), French racing driver
Philippe Cochet (born 1961), French politician
Vladimir Cochet, Swiss musician
Yves Cochet (born 1946), French politician

French-language surnames